Bartolomé Lloveras (c.1890 – c.1950) was an Argentine footballer who played as a forward for Club Atlético Independiente

Career 

Lloveras began his career at Club Atlético Banfield, in December 1910 had been part of the Banfield team  who played twice for a place in the final for promotion to first division against Racing Club de Avellaneda. The first match ended goalless, and in the second match, Racing got a win in the last minute of the match. Racing finally played the final against Boca Juniors and won promotion to the first division. In 1911 Lloveras left the Banfield team to join reinforcements of Independiente.

On July 5, 1912, Independente confirms their withdrawal from the Argentine Football Association and inclusion in the Argentine Football Federation where the First Division would have seven more teams: Argentino de Quilmes, Atlanta, Estudiantes de La Plata, Gimnasia y Esgrima de Buenos Aires, Kimberley, Porteño and Sociedad Sportiva Argentina. On August 14, 1912, Bartolomé Lloveras made its debut playing in First Division marking one of the three goals by Independiente in the 3–0 win over Kimberley. On Dec 22, 1912 Lloveras scored a goal in the Championship final between Independiente and Club Atlético Porteño (championship awarded to Porteño).

References

External links 
www.diasdehistoria.com.ar

Argentine footballers
Footballers from Buenos Aires
Club Atlético Independiente footballers
Association football forwards
Argentine people of Spanish descent
Club Atlético Banfield footballers
Year of birth uncertain
1890s births
Río de la Plata
1950s deaths